Giuseppe Crivelli (18 October 1900 – 2 June 1950) was an Italian rower and bobsledder who competed in the 1924 Summer Olympics and in the 1928 Winter Olympics. He was born in Milan. In 1924 he won the bronze medal as crew member of the Italian boat in the men's eight competition. Four years later he was a member of the Italian bobsleigh team that finished 21st in the five man event.

References

1900 births
1950 deaths
Rowers from Milan
Sportspeople from Milan
Italian male rowers
Italian male bobsledders
Olympic rowers of Italy
Olympic bobsledders of Italy
Rowers at the 1924 Summer Olympics
Bobsledders at the 1928 Winter Olympics
Olympic bronze medalists for Italy
Olympic medalists in rowing
Medalists at the 1924 Summer Olympics
European Rowing Championships medalists